Gabriel Blando (born 1925) is a Colombian fencer. He competed in the individual and team foil events at the 1956 Summer Olympics.

References

External links

1925 births
Possibly living people
Colombian male foil fencers
Olympic fencers of Colombia
Fencers at the 1956 Summer Olympics
20th-century Colombian people